Begum Anwar Ahmed was a Pakistani feminist, who served as chairman of the United Nations Commission on the Status of Women in 1958 and as the 6th president of the International Alliance of Women from 1964 to 1970.

Her husband served as Pakistan's Ambassador to the United States.

References

Pakistani feminists
International Alliance of Women people
Possibly living people